Gustavo Henrique Giordano Amaro Assunção da Silva (born 30 March 2000), known as Gustavo Assunção, is a Brazilian professional footballer who plays as a midfielder for Primeira Liga club Famalicão.

Club career

Famalicão
On 1 July 2019, Assunção signed his first professional contract with Famalicão. Assunção made his professional debut with Famalicão in a 2-0 Taça da Liga loss to S.C. Covilhã on 3 August 2019.

Loan to Galatasaray
On 8 September 2021, it was announced that Assunção would leave Famalicão for Turkish Süper Lig club Galatasaray on a one-year loan move. Famalicão recalled him from his loan spell at Galatasaray on January 21, 2022, after playing only 2 games for the Turkish outfit.

International career
Born in Brazil, Assunção spent his youth in Portugal and Spain and holds passports to all three countries. He was called up to the Brazil national under-17 football team in 2016.

Personal life
Assunção is the son of the Brazilian retired footballer Paulo Assunção. His maternal grandfather was born in Pombal, Portugal, and through him Assunção holds Portuguese citizenship.

Career statistics

Club

References

External links

2000 births
Living people
Footballers from São Paulo
Brazilian footballers
Brazil youth international footballers
Brazilian people of Portuguese descent
F.C. Famalicão players
Primeira Liga players
Association football midfielders
Brazilian expatriate footballers
Expatriate footballers in Portugal
Brazilian expatriate sportspeople in Portugal
Galatasaray S.K. footballers
Süper Lig players
Brazilian expatriate sportspeople in Turkey
Expatriate footballers in Turkey